David Bain (5 August 1900 – 22 February 1966) was a Scottish footballer who initially played as a forward but later became known as a centre-half.

Career
Born in Rutherglen in Lanarkshire, Bain played for local Rutherglen Glencairn and was capped once for Scotland Juniors in April 1922 before signing for Manchester United, then in England's second tier, at the age of 21.

In his second campaign at Old Trafford he scored 8 goals in 18 matches, attracting the attention of Everton, where he spent a four-year spell in the Football League First Division. He was a member of the inconsistent squad built around Dixie Dean who were nearly relegated but then immediately went on to take the league title in 1927–28, albeit by then Bain had fallen out of favour, featuring only twice in the championship season.

After his Goodison Park experience he joined Bristol City, then moved down the divisions with Halifax Town and Rochdale, spending two seasons at each club.

Personal life
Bain's older brother, Jimmy, also played for Manchester United. Although they were at the club at the same time for two years, they never appeared together in a competitive fixture.

In 1927, Bain married a Welsh girl in Bootle and two sons were born of their marriage. From 1948, they lived in Mather Avenue in Allerton, Liverpool, where he died in 1966.

References

1900 births
1966 deaths
Sportspeople from Rutherglen
Scottish footballers
Association football forwards
Rutherglen Glencairn F.C. players
Scottish Junior Football Association players
Everton F.C. players
Bristol City F.C. players
Halifax Town A.F.C. players
Rochdale A.F.C. players
Manchester United F.C. players
English Football League players
Association football midfielders
Scotland junior international footballers
Footballers from South Lanarkshire